Sean Marielle Higgins (born December 30, 1968) is an American former professional basketball player. He played college basketball for Michigan, whom he helped win the 1989 national championship. He hit the winning basket in the Final Four against Illinois to propel Michigan into the championship game versus Seton Hall.

Higgins was selected by the San Antonio Spurs of the 1990 NBA Draft, and played for the Spurs, Orlando Magic, Golden State Warriors, New Jersey Nets, Philadelphia 76ers and Portland Trail Blazers in eight NBA seasons. He also played overseas in several countries.

In 2004 Higgins became General Manager and Head Coach of the Fresno Heatwave of the American Basketball Assoc. Higgins was hired as the Edmonds Community College, Edmonds, Washington head basketball coach from 2009 to 2012.

He is currently USA director of Nine Star Basketball Camps that specializes in basketball player development and exposure for amateur & professional player's, and managing partner of Nine Star Basketball Scouting Services. 

Higgins is also founder, chairman and CEO of Royal Eagle Holding's Inc, a technology, healthcare and real estate investment company, with concentration on acquisitions and mergers. In addition, he is managing partner of Victory USA Development LTD, focusing on building 5000+ seat, multiplex sports & entertainment venues throughout the United States.

References

External links
www.edcc.edu profile
Sean Higgins profile at basketball-reference.com
Higgins' college & NBA stats
Fibaeurope.com profile

1968 births
Living people
American expatriate basketball people in Greece
American expatriate basketball people in Russia
American expatriate basketball people in Turkey
American expatriate basketball people in Venezuela
American men's basketball players
Aris B.C. players
Basketball coaches from California
Basketball players from Los Angeles
Fairfax High School (Los Angeles) alumni
Golden State Warriors players
Grand Rapids Hoops players
Greek Basket League players
McDonald's High School All-Americans
Michigan Wolverines men's basketball players
New Jersey Nets players
Orlando Magic players
Parade High School All-Americans (boys' basketball)
PBC Ural Great players
Philadelphia 76ers players
Portland Trail Blazers players
San Antonio Spurs draft picks
San Antonio Spurs players
Small forwards
American expatriate basketball people in the Philippines
Philippine Basketball Association imports
Pop Cola Panthers players